The surface of Mars has been divided into thirty cartographic quadrangles by the United States Geological Survey. Each quadrangle is a region covering a specified range of latitudes and longitudes on the Martian surface. The quadrangles are named after classical albedo features, and they are numbered from one to thirty with the prefix "MC" (for "Mars Chart"), with the numbering running from north to south and from west to east.

The quadrangles appear as rectangles on maps based on a cylindrical map projection, but their actual shapes on the curved surface of Mars are more complicated Saccheri quadrilaterals. The sixteen equatorial quadrangles are the smallest, with surface areas of  each, while the twelve mid-latitude quadrangles each cover . The two polar quadrangles are the largest, with surface areas of  each.

History 
In 1972, NASA's Mariner 9 mission returned thousands of photographs collectively covering more than 80% of the Martian surface. That year and the next, NASA's Jet Propulsion Laboratory collaborated with the United States Geological Survey's Astrogeology Research Program to assemble Mariner's photographs into the first detailed photomosaic maps of Mars. To organize and subdivide this work, the USGS divided the planet's surface into thirty cartographic quadrangles, each named for classical albedo features within the respective regions, and the various quadrangles were assigned to geologists at USGS and at American universities for mapping and study.

As continuing missions to Mars have made increasingly accurate maps available, the International Astronomical Union has assigned names to regions of the planet's surface that reflect its actual surface features and geology. These names are also broadly inspired by classical albedo features, with the result that they generally correspond to the names of the arbitrary USGS quadrangles, though larger IAU features frequently span multiple quadrangles.

Quadrangles 
The maps below were produced by the Mars Global Surveyors Mars Orbiter Laser Altimeter; redder colors indicate higher elevations. The maps of the equatorial quadrangles use a Mercator projection, while those of the mid-latitude quadrangles use a Lambert conformal conic projection, and the maps of the polar quadrangles use a polar stereographic projection.

See also 
 List of quadrangles on Mercury
 List of quadrangles on Venus
 List of quadrangles on the Moon

References